is a Japanese manga series written and illustrated by Meguru Ueno. It has been serialized in Kodansha's seinen manga magazine Weekly Young Magazine since September 2021.

Premise
Sora Nezu is shocked to find that his childhood neighbor and crush Suzune Nekogami has become a sexy, tanned gal teacher at his high school. While she is serious and strict with him during class time, she flirts with and gets him aroused outside of the classroom. His female classmates and teachers also show erotic interest in him.

Characters
 
 As a child, Sora used to be taken care by his neighbor and crush "Suzu-nee" when he was young, but rejects her outwardly when they were taking a bath together and he got sexually aroused. Now in his first year at high school, he tries to reconcile their relationship, but when she behaves erotically around him again, he gets aroused more and cannot stop thinking of her.
 
 Sora's former neighbor, she used to have a friendly and proper appearance when she babysat and played with him until she was rejected by him for inadvertently sexually arousing him. In high school, she pursues a gal lifestyle and bleaches her hair blonde with ganguro (dark skin) complexion. She returns as Sora's physical education / health teacher, and the advisor of their biology club. Outside of class, she teases him with increasingly erotic activities short of intercourse, wanting him to admit his perversion. 
 Samejima and Kamoi
 Sora's guy classmates, they form a biology club with Sora and Maina, with Suzune as their advisor.
 Maina Uzuki 
 A beautiful high school gal who also has a social media following. Because all the school boys fawn over her except for Sora, she shows interest towards him and joins the biology club.  But when he accidentally falls on her in an awkward "lucky pervert" manner, she then becomes aroused whenever she thinks of him, and acts upon that when alone, intoxicated, or in close contact with Sora. She is jealous of Sora's relationship with Suzune.
 Mamiko Hitsuji 
 The school nurse and Suzu's former schoolmate. She likes to experiment with different fragrance oils and uses Sora as a boy toy. Some of the chapter titles refer to her as Mama-sensei because of her airhead-like motherly demeanor, glasses that she cannot see without, clumsiness and voluptuous chest. She used to be a delinquent gal in high school.
 Aoi Althea Blancheval
 Althea-sensei is an English teacher and advisor for their English & Social Studies (ESS) club. She started at the same year as Suzune and views her as a rival. Her first interactions with Sora was also inadvertently erotic.
 Tsukasa Saginomiya
 Tsukasa is introduced as a school prince who represents the ESS club in fighting against Sora at the school festival. However during the match, when Sora accidentally tears open Tsukasa's jacket and realizes that Tsukasa is a girl who has bound her breasts, he protects Tsukasa from having that known. Per her family tradition, Tsukasa is required to dress as a man until she comes of age or falls in love. She falls for Sora and wants to be his girlfriend.

Publication
Written and illustrated by Meguru Ueno, Gal-sen started in Kodansha's seinen manga magazine Weekly Young Magazine on September 13, 2021. Kodansha has collected its chapters into individual tankōbon volumes. The first volume was released on February 4, 2022. As of November 4, 2022, four volumes have been released.

Volume list

See also
 My First Girlfriend Is a Gal, another manga series by the same author
 Does a Hot Elf Live Next Door to You?, another manga series by the same author

References

External links
  

Kodansha manga
Sex comedy anime and manga
Seinen manga
Gyaru in fiction